Events from the year 1914 in Scotland.

Incumbents 

 Secretary for Scotland and Keeper of the Great Seal – Thomas McKinnon Wood

Law officers 
 Lord Advocate – Robert Munro
 Solicitor General for Scotland – Thomas Brash Morison

Judiciary 
 Lord President of the Court of Session and Lord Justice General – Lord Strathclyde
 Lord Justice Clerk – Lord Kingsburgh
 Chairman of the Scottish Land Court – Lord Kennedy

Events 
 21 February – Militant suffragette Ethel Moorhead, imprisoned in Calton Jail, Edinburgh, for attempted fire-raising, becomes the first in Scotland to suffer force-feeding while on hunger strike; four days later she is released on health grounds.
 14 April – A collision at Burntisland railway station between an express and a shunting goods train following a signalman's error kills two locomotive crew and injures twelve passengers.
 2 May – Glasgow newspaper The Saturday Post, a predecessor of The Sunday Post, changes its title to The Sporting Post.
 18 June – A railway bridge collapse at Carrbridge following a torrential thunderstorm kills five people.
 July – Militant suffragette Fanny Parker is arrested while attempting (probably with Ethel Moorhead) to set fire to Burns Cottage, Alloway.
 3 July – Govanhill Baths in Glasgow inaugurated.
 4 July – A memorial is unveiled at Hawick to the Battle of Hornshole (1514).
 10 July – A royal visit to Scotland is interrupted by suffragettes: one attempts to reach the King and Queen's carriage at Dundee; and Rhoda Fleming leaps onto the footboard of the royal car at Perth; police protect her from an angry crowd.
 30 July – Norwegian aviator Tryggve Gran makes the first crossing of the North Sea by aeroplane, flying from Cruden Bay to Jæren in Norway in the Blériot XI monoplane Ca Flotte.
 August – The British Royal Navy's Grand Fleet is formed in Scapa Flow.
 4 August – World War I: Declaration of war by the United Kingdom on the German Empire.
 9 August – World War I: Light cruiser  rams and sinks Imperial German Navy submarine U-15 off Fair Isle, the first U-boat claimed by the Royal Navy.
 28 August–28 September – World War I: German spy Carl Hans Lody is operating from Edinburgh.
 September – World War I
 Revolutionary socialist teacher John Maclean holds his first anti-war rally, on Glasgow Green.
 Rumours spread that Russian troops, landed on the east coast of Scotland, have passed on trains through Britain en route to the Western Front.
 5 September – World War I: Scout cruiser  is sunk by German submarine U-21 in the Firth of Forth with loss of all but nine of her crew, the first ship ever to be sunk by a locomotive torpedo fired from a submarine.
 8 September – Armed merchant cruiser HMS Oceanic runs aground on the Shaalds o' Foula and is lost.
 14 September – World War I: Scottish soldiers William Henry Johnston, Ross Tollerton and George Wilson are awarded the Victoria Cross in separate actions on the Western Front.
 26 September – World War I: the 15th (Scottish) Infantry Division, newly formed as part of Kitchener's Army, first parades as a unit.
 15 October – World War I: Protected cruiser  is torpedoed by German submarine U-9 off Aberdeen, sinking in under ten minutes with the loss of 524 crew and only seventy survivors.
 16/17 October – World War I: Scare of submarine attack in Scapa Flow causes the Grand Fleet to disperse while the anchorage is secured.
 22 October – World War I: Glaswegian Private Henry May, a regular soldier with 1st Battalion, The Cameronians (Scottish Rifles) at La Boutillerie, is awarded the Victoria Cross for rescuing wounded comrades.
 3 November – Trawler Ivanhoe, requisitioned as an armed patrol vessel, strikes the Black Rock near Leith while minelaying and sinks.
 23 November – World War I: German submarine U-18 is intercepted and forced to scuttle while attempting to enter Scapa Flow.
 25 November – World War I: sixteen Heart of Midlothian F.C. players enlist en masse – seven will die in action before the war ends.
 St Andrew's Cathedral, Aberdeen, raised to the status of cathedral within the Episcopal Church.
 A. & R. Scott introduce the brand name Scott's Porage Oats.

Births 
 1 January – Alexander Reid, playwright (died 1982)
 13 March – Kay Tremblay film actress, living in Canada (died 2005 in Stratford, Ontario)
 26 May – Archie Duncan, actor (died 1979)
 14 June – Alexander Buchanan Campbell, architect (died 2007)
 14 June – Ruthven Todd, poet, artist and novelist (died October 1978 in Spain)
 25 June – Matthew McDiarmid, literary scholar, essayist, campaigning academic and poet (died 1996)
 15 July – Gavin Maxwell, naturalist and writer (died 1969)
 4 November – Duncan Macrae, international rugby union player (died 2007)
 20 December – Robert Colquhoun, painter, printmaker and theatre set designer (died 1962 in London)
 29 December – Tom Weir, climber, naturalist and broadcaster (died 2006)
 Richard Scott, general practitioner and academic (died 1983)
 Ann Scott-Moncrieff, author (died 1943)

Deaths 
 1 March – Gilbert Elliot-Murray-Kynynmound, 4th Earl of Minto, soldier and colonial administrator (born 1845 in London)
 16 March – Sir John Murray, oceanographer, marine biologist and limnologist (born 1841 in Canada)
 31 March – William Henry Oliphant Smeaton, writer, journalist, editor, historian and educator (born in 1856)
 26 June – Edward Calvert, domestic architect (born 1847 in Brentford)
 30 September – Sir Henry Littlejohn, forensic surgeon (born 1826)
 21 October – James William Cleland, Liberal Party MP for Glasgow Bridgeton (1906–10) (born 1874)
 19 December – William Bruce, soldier, posthumous recipient of the Victoria Cross (born 1890; killed in action near Givenchy)
 25 December – Donald MacKinnon, Celtic scholar (born in 1839)

The arts
 16 March – the Usher Hall opens in Edinburgh as a concert hall.
 John MacDougall Hay's novel Gillespie is published.
 Bandmaster Frederick J. Ricketts ('Kenneth J. Alford') composes the "Colonel Bogey March" while serving with the Argyll and Sutherland Highlanders at Fort George.

References 

 
Scotland
Years of the 20th century in Scotland
1910s in Scotland